Eligio Cuitláhuac González Farías (born 22 July 1977) is a Mexican politician affiliated with the PRI. He currently serves as Deputy of the LXII Legislature of the Mexican Congress representing Michoacán.

References

1977 births
Living people
People from Morelia
Politicians from Michoacán
Institutional Revolutionary Party politicians
21st-century Mexican politicians
Universidad Michoacana de San Nicolás de Hidalgo alumni
Members of the Congress of Michoacán
Deputies of the LXII Legislature of Mexico
Members of the Chamber of Deputies (Mexico) for Michoacán